Chromolaena sagittata  is a Mexican species of flowering shrub in the family Asteraceae. It is found in western Mexico, in the states of Sonora, Sinaloa, Nayarit, and Baja California Sur.

Chromolaena sagittata is an herb with opposite, arrow-shaped leaves about 2.5 cm (1 inch) long.

References

External links
 photo of herbarium specimen at Missouri Botanical, collected in 1848, type specimen of Chromolaena sagittata/Eupatorium sagittatum

sagittata
Flora of Sonora
Flora of Sinaloa
Flora of Nayarit
Flora of Baja California Sur
Plants described in 1948